Aethes pamirana is a species of moth of the family Tortricidae. It was described by Razowski in 1967. It is endemic to Afghanistan.

References

External links

pamirana
Moths described in 1967
Moths of Asia
Taxa named by Józef Razowski